Days Are Mighty is the fifth album by American-born singer-songwriter Jeb Loy Nichols, released in 2007 on the Tuition record label in the UK and the Compass record label in the US. The US release also included a limited edition 2-CD set in which the second disc was a set of demos featuring Nichols singing and playing the acoustic guitar.

Track listing
"My Kind" – 2:53
"Days Are Mighty" – 2:47
"Lay Down and Cry" – 3:11
"25 Years Too Late" – 3:17
"Can't Find the Words" – 2:16
"Poor Little Barn" – 2:58
"That's Not What She Said to Me" – 2:40
"After November" – 3:07
"Let's Not Fall" – 3:06
"Almost" – 2:55
"I Need You So" – 4:14

Disc 2 (available only on limited edition Compass Records release)
"I Need You So" – 2:19
"Let's Not Fall" – 2:47
"My Kind" – 2:20
"Days Are Mighty" – 2:14
"Can't Find the Words" – 2:22
"Lazy Afternoon" – 1:48
"Poor Little Barn" – 1:51
"Almost" – 2:16
"25 Years Too Late" – 2:56
"Still Tomorrow" – 2:47

Reception

Nichols' fifth release received positive reviews. Allmusic said "this is the best recording he's issued yet. He has no gimmick, no schtick; his artful, unpretentious songwriting is accessible to virtually anyone, and is so precise in a musical sense that it is poetic and spacious without having to venture to reach very far." Twangville said "Overall Jeb Loy Nichols has given us a group of songs on Days are Mighty that provide an impactful musical and emotional milieu."

References

2007 albums
Jeb Loy Nichols albums
Compass Records albums